Henri Charles Guérard (26 April 1846, Paris - 24 March 1897, Paris) was a French painter, engraver, lithographer and print maker.

Biography 
He began his studies at the École Nationale Supérieure des Beaux-Arts, majoring in architecture, but slowly turned his attention to painting and engraving.

Guérard and Paul Gachet were in charge of the illustrations. During this time, he frequented the salon of Nina de Callias and became a friend of Édouard Manet. Later, together with the actress, Ellen Andrée, he posed for one of Manet's paintings; "At the Café".

In 1879, he married Eva Gonzalès, one of Manet's students and models. They moved to a farm near Honfleur, where they hosted several well known painters, including Paul Cézanne and Norbert Goeneutte, who became a close friend. Two years later, he illustrated Les Caravanes de Scaramouche, by his father-in-law, Emmanuel Gonzalès.

Eva died in 1883, while giving birth to their son, Jean Raymond, who would become a theatrical painter. His friend, Manet, died less than two weeks later, leaving him too depressed to work for a long period. He remarried in 1888, to his sister-in-law, who was also a painter.

He was named a Knight in the Legion of Honor in 1893.

He was an avid collector (what might now be called a "hoarder") of everything from old shoes to lanterns. Many of his etchings are of odd objects and earned him a title: "The Engraver of Curiosities".

Selected works

References

Further reading 
 C. Bertin, Henri Guérard, l'œuvre gravé, catalogue raisonnée in 3 volumes, Paris, l'École du Louvre, 1975
 "Henri Guérard, peintre graveur", in: Nouvelles de l'estampe, #31, January–February 1977
 Marie-Caroline Sainsaulieu, Henri Guérard (1846-1897), exhibition catalogue, Paris, Galerie Antoine Laurentin, 1999, 
 Monique Moulène, "Henri Guérard, la fantaisie comme esthétique", in: Le blog de Gallica, 8 February 2017. (Online)

External links 

 "Henri-Charles Guérard's Curiosity" by Madeleine Viljoen @ the New York Public Library
 More works by Guérard @ Artnet

1846 births
1897 deaths
19th-century French painters
French engravers
French lithographers
French illustrators
Painters from Paris